Banca Cívica, S.A. was a bank created as a result of the European debt crisis as an emergency response by the Spanish government regulatory authority "Institutional Protection System" (Spanish: Sistema Institucional de Protección, or SIP) that comprised the savings banks of Caja Navarra, Caja Canarias, Caja de Burgos and Cajasol. It became part of Caixabank on 3 August 2012, at which time shares for the company ceased to be quoted.

History
This institution, the founding entities of which were Caja de Burgos, CajaCanarias and Caja Navarra, was incorporated as a bank by means of notarial instrument issued on 9 June 2010. It began operating on 18 June 2010 and was the first SIP to operate in Spain.

The institution announced its merger with CaixaBank on 23 March 2012.

On 26 June 2012, the Extraordinary General Shareholders' Meeting approved the institution's incorporation in CaixaBank. The operation established the leading institution on the Spanish market, with over 13 million clients and assets of 342,000 million euros. Incorporation neither required public guarantees nor represented any cost at all to the rest of the finance sector.

Stock Market
Banca Civica raised 600 million Euros in its IPO in July 2011.

See also
 Caja Navarra scandal
 2008–14 Spanish financial crisis
 List of banks in Europe

References

External links
 Banca Civica web site

Spanish companies established in 2010
Spanish companies disestablished in 2012
CaixaBank
Defunct banks of Spain